The Audi A2 (internally designated Typ 8Z) is a compact MPV-styled supermini car, with a five-door hatchback body style and four or five seats, produced by the German manufacturer Audi from November 1999 (for the 2000 model year) to August 2005. Based on the Audi Al2 concept car first shown at the Frankfurt Motor Show in 1997, the A2 was notable for being constructed from aluminium, which in combination with its efficient engines, made it an extremely economical car on fuel.

Packages available in Germany included 'Advance', 'Style', 'High Tech', and later 'S line'; whereas in the United Kingdom, the A2 was available in various trim levels, including: 'Standard', 'SE' (for 'Special Equipment'), 'Sport', 'Special Edition' (2005 only).

History
The A2 was produced at Audi's "aluminium" Neckarsulm plant in Germany on a special line purpose-built for it. Due to its construction, the average A2 weighs 830 kg. The last A2s to be produced were built in August 2005.

Styling

The A2 was a surprise when it debuted only two years after the original Al2 study. Many initial reviews, including those from What Car? and Autocar in the UK commented on the design.

Autocar's initial drive verdict
"The best thing about the A2 is that it isn’t merely a design exercise. Yes, it’s a great car to look at, sit in and touch, but it’s also a riot to drive".

The avant-garde styling did not, however, win favour with some potential customers.  Audi was reported to be disappointed with the level of sales. The final production was only 176,377 units, in comparison to rival Mercedes-Benz's A-Class sales of 1 million.

Design, engineering and construction

The overriding theme in the design and engineering of the A2 was summarized by the then Audi UK product manager in an interview after the car won a design award in 2001 as "create a small Audi, not a cheap Audi", and the creative brief is said to have been "Transport four people from Stuttgart to Milan on a single tank of petrol".

The A2 is built with a considerable amount of aluminium and aluminium alloy, making it weigh significantly less than cars of similar size. Its reduced weight helps it to use much less fuel than vehicles using traditional steel monocoques. The A2 was also notable for being the first Audi model since the 1970s Audi 50 (type 86) and Audi 100 (type 43) not to be offered with its 'trademark' quattro four-wheel drive option. The A2 has a coefficient of drag of between 0.25 and 0.29, depending on the specific version.

The A2 still uses a contemporary unibody construction, with significant elements of space frame principles, and it is tagged by Audi as an 'Audi Space Frame' design.  The outer panels of the body have little or no structural function – similarities exist with the original Renault Espace – and the space frame bears the forces working on the car.  The frame uses casts and extrusions which are laser welded together to make the space frame. Improvements in shell stability, durability and stiffness, lower weight, and more interior space are results of its construction.  "The A2, on the other hand, was designed as an aluminum car and the spaceframe has been optimized by parts consolidation, using large, cost-effective castings instead of aluminum stampings".

Unfortunately, the cost of working with aluminium, particularly with small production runs, meant that the A2 was more expensive than other cars in its sector, competing with the A-class and losing. Much of the high production cost was due to so many parts not being "off the shelf" and being specifically optimized for the A2.
From Autobild in 2003: "The A2 is not one of the models with the highest return on investment". The same article quotes the sales figures for 2002 as being 20,000 in Germany against 80,000 for the A-Class and "...lots of money for a car that is only 3.8m long."

Audi was the first manufacturer to try to incorporate lightweight building concepts using aluminium and associated alloys into a "mass market" vehicle. Previous efforts at using the Audi Space Frame were limited to the rather more expensive Audi A8.

The A2 can thus be considered a trailblazer for various newer aluminium-based vehicles, such as the second generation Audi A8, the Audi TT, and Jaguar's recent X350 Jaguar XJ and 2006 Jaguar XK.

Parts of the A2 which are still made of steel include the bulkhead behind the front bumper (the "slam panel"), the wiper arm, standard A2 suspension components (the 3l ones are frequently of aluminium alloy), the rear brake drums and the exhaust system.

Interior
This is significantly larger than the luggage space of the next model in Audi's range, the Audi A3. Due to the "sandwich"-type construction, similar again to that of the Renault Espace or the Mercedes A-Class, the floorpan has an upper and a lower portion. The space in the middle is used to house various components, such as the fuel tank and the engine's electronics. The rear passengers also benefit, as their foot space reaches into this sandwich space, creating a comfortable seating position even for tall rear seat passengers. This is in direct contrast to the comfort available on the rear bench of an A-Class. To improve the weight distribution of the vehicle, its battery is located inside the boot, under the floor.

The A2's interior was very upmarket in comparison with other superminis. In both the UK and Europe, there were several choices of seat material and colour, comprising the standard Cirrus cloth, optional Matrix cloth, optional Alcantara/leather, or full pearl Nappa leather seat coverings.  Sport models received sport seats with electrically adjustable lumbar support as standard in jacquard satin cloth.  Seat materials were available in a choice of red, blue, beige ("jive" or "twist", code 4QC), pale grey ("platinum", code EC3), dark grey ("swing", 24S) or black ("soul", 6PS).  Individual options were also available such as vivid yellow, red or blue seats, steering wheels, gear lever, handbrake lever and door armrests. The color.storm models introduced in 2003 brought bright colours to both the outside and inside of the A2, including "papaya" orange. Soft touch materials are used on the doors and contact areas in the centre console, though they have a tendency to wear over time, especially on the climate control keys.

Quattro GmbH – as Audi Exclusive – were prepared to customise the A2 in the same ways that they would any other Audi. Anecdotal evidence suggests that the number of "Individual" painted cars is extremely small; among the several thousand German A2 owners represented in the A2-freun.de forum, only two individual cars have ever been noted. The colours available corresponded to the extended Volkswagen Group palette at the time—including any Volkswagen Group colour and many others too—but the option was expensive, at around €2000. A set of 10 A2s is said to have been created in Almond beige with orange color.storm interiors as dealer demonstrators and at least two of these have been seen on the used market in the past. It is impossible to document the existence of these vehicles, not least due to the lack of co-operation from the German authorities in terms of freely available, reliable, colour information, and that used-car websites are not archived.

The A2 had many innovative ideas, such as the space floor storage system which was a box that slotted in the rear passenger foot well, a rear cup holder which unclipped, and a double (false) floor boot where items could be hidden from thieves or where the space saver spare wheel could be stored. The warning triangle and first aid kit are stowed directly to the left of the boot opening. The toolkit was stored, depending on equipment, next to the battery. If space was needed for the navigation system and/or the Bose subwoofer, it was moved to the sandwich compartment in front of the right-front seat (driver on UK cars, passenger on LHD ones). The headrests also do not need to be removed from the rear seats when they are folded, and a four-seater can have the rear seats removed in a matter of seconds. The rear seat belts have a clip in the upper section of the c-pillar, so that when the seats are folded and returned to their normal position, the belts do not get tangled.
More examples of energy saving can be found in the glovebox light that only turns on when the lights are on and the freewheel pulley on the alternator belt, meaning that the alternator is only used when necessary. The climate compressor is also turned off when the ambient temperature drops below 5 °C.
The ECON function of the climate control (where fitted) also turns off the auxiliary heating or the compressor, depending on temperature. This functionality is unaffected by the presence of fuel-powered or electrical auxiliary heating.

Service Hatch (Serviceklappe)
The front of the car included an unusual design feature called the "Serviceklappe" in German – this translates to "service hatch" or "service panel".  On early cars, this was a glossy black panel at the lower edge of the bonnet (hood), where the radiator grille would normally be sited. Behind it are the filling points for oil and screen wash fluid and the dipstick. Thanks to these features, the bonnet does not need to be raised often.

The bonnet was widely rumoured to be sealed – Car and Driver wrote: "...feature of the A2 that may foretell the future: the sealed hood". Actually, the bonnet is easily removed, being held in place by two twist-lock catches. The bonnet, weighing 8 kg, then comes away from the car altogether, unlike the usual hinged flip-up arrangement on most other cars. Due to the service hatch, the bonnet does not need to be removed frequently for access to the engine.

Facelift and additional models
The service hatch is the most obvious indicator of the age of any particular A2. It was changed to matte black for the "color.storm" colour schemes, and for model year 2004 it acquired fake grille slats. However it can be changed easily, so it should not be taken as a reliable age indicator.
Very little else was changed externally during the life of the car. Colours and wheels designs were changed mildly during the production run. The only other external indicator of the age of the car is the windscreen wiper. Very early models have a traditional blade, but starting in model year 2002, newer cars have a "flex" version ("Aerotwin" from Bosch, model 760).

Changes and additions

2000–2001
 February 2000: introduction of the A2 with  petrol engine
 September 2000: introduction of the  diesel
 June 2001: introduction of the 1.2 TDI engine in 3L into mainland European market.

2002–2003
 CAN-BUS is used for the OBD systems, as required by EU Regulations.
 Aerotwin wiper
 Aluminium trim pack becomes standard equipment in the UK
 Diesel-engined A2s after May 2002 no longer have a pre-heater run by diesel, but a powerful internal electrical heating element.
 May 2002: Use of the 42l petrol tank in all non 3l versions. 3l available with 21l standard tank or 34l tank, allowing a theoretical 1100 km range.
 June 2002: 1.6 FSI engine introduced with the larger (42l) petrol tank and re-modelled rear spoiler (higher position, larger size to increase high speed stability). Non S-line FSI's featured re-tuned softer suspension tuning due to many complaints over the harsh ride of other models
 The first color.storms (in 'Misano' red, 'Imola' yellow and 'Sprint' blue) became available. These brought colours which had only previously been available on S and RS models or as an Audi Exclusive option to the standard colour chart.
 Diesel engines used after September 2003, engine code BHC, fulfil the requirements for Euro4 exhaust emissions, again as a result of legislation.
 Spare tyre and tyre repair kit delete becomes a paid-for optional extra in the UK

2003–2004
 Extended color.storm colour options, including 'Papaya' orange and later 'Avus' silver
 September / October 2003: Availability of the  TDI. Grille now with slats (but still solid), new Matrix cloth replaces both satellite and jacquard-satin cloth, yellow leather no longer available, additional external colours available including Akoya Silver and Mauritius Blue, New Wheel designs became available
 Use of MK60 ESP / ABS system.
 FSI and  TDI engines phased out towards late 2004/early 2005

2005
 Special Edition (including CD player and climate control) models introduced into UK markets, at this time no other models were available in the UK
 Audi lost an estimated £4,000 on every A2 they sold and only made money on cars with optional extras. Continued production of the model was reviewed by the board of directors
 Production of the A2 is halted by VW/Audi group boss Bernd Pischetsrieder. Overall, Audi lost €7,530 per vehicle produced.

Special versions
Audi also has a version of the A2 in its Neckarsulm plant which has been converted into a pickup truck by trainees – the "A2 Caddy". This was on public show for the first time at the A2-Club of Germany's annual meeting in Amberg, Germany, in August 2005. Pictures of the event are available on the German A2-freun.de site linked below.

Audi also released an S-line version in Germany as of late 2002, with 17" 9-spoke "RS4" style wheels (standard were 15"), sports seats with large side bolsters and lumbar support, special half-leather seat coverings with Pearl Nappa leather and Sprint cloth, leather handbrake handle, perforated leather gearstick and 3-spoke steering wheel and 10 mm lowered sports suspension. Additionally, the interior roof lining, the dashboard and carpets were black, the instrument faces titanium-coloured and an S-line badge was added to the rear doors. The driver information system and illuminated vanity mirrors for driver and passenger completed the package.

In the UK, the last Audi A2s (from early 2005 to June 2005) were badged as special edition models featuring a reduced price tag, digital climate control and a 'Concert II' radio with CD player as standard. They were the only models available in the UK at this time and were available with either the 1.4 petrol or 1.4 TDI engines. This special edition gave the A2 a final sales boost in the UK.

Lekker/DBM electric version
In October 2010, an A2 converted to electric power by Lekker Energie and DBM Energy completed an early morning  drive from Munich to Berlin on a single charge. Upon arrival, Rainer Bruederle, Germany's Economics Minister, called the test drive a "world record."

The car was said to still have 18% of its charge remaining on arrival in Berlin and the average speed was reported as being 90 km/h (56 mph). The "kolibri" batteries used in the design are so compact that the vehicle retains its four seats and boot space. A production version would be possible. "The technology could be implemented today. It is up to industry to use this potential," commented Mirko Hannemann, the head of DBM.

Remaining numbers in UK and Germany

The number of remaining A2s is decreasing over time. The aluminium chassis is frequently written off by insurers due to the relative dearth of "aluminium specialists" – for example one in all of Scotland – and the training and experience required to repair the shell. Welding is frequently required and aluminium is more difficult to weld than steel due to the lack of colour change when heated which acts as guide to temperature when welding steel. It is also usually welded with TIG welding which is a higher skill process than MIG welding that is commonly used with steel.

Other repair specialisations are subject to denial on the part of Audi both in the UK and Germany, especially when dealing with Open Sky. Certain dealerships, such as the mentioned Autohaus Rinner in Bad Tölz in southern Germany, have specialised in roof repairs and replacements.

The KBA ("Kraftfahrtbundesamt") released numbers on request and after payment to the German A2 club which indicate that around 70,000 A2s are registered in Germany as of end November 2010. Of those, less than 5,000 are 1.6 FSIs. This information was released on condition that it was not for publication, so the full statistics are only available to members. Colour information is not recorded.

1.2 TDI "3L"
The Audi A2 1.2 TDI had the lowest drag coefficient of any car in the world at the time of its launch. It was also one of the most economical and least polluting, only emitting 81 g/km (German emission standard D4) to 86 g/km (D3 emission standard)  emissions. The Audi A2 3L reuses the engine and special gearbox developed for the equally efficient Volkswagen Lupo 1.2 TDI 3L.

Two versions of the car were available in Germany during its production run. The D4 version, which used only , was "standard." It had no power steering, air conditioning or other extras, with the only optional extra being body coloured door handles and wing mirrors. There were no optional extras because optional equipment adds weight and therefore reduces economy. It had a fixed rear seat cushion. The tested fuel economy was 2.88 L/100 km.

The second version, which was at least available in Germany, was a D3 version which was still capable of 3.0 L/100 km. This version had options for air conditioning, a winter package, and a comfort package, but was not available in all markets. Ordering these packages ensured power steering or spot lamps as part of a package. The OSS system was not available at all on the 3L.

Both versions had thinner glass, lighter seats, and 14" magnesium alloy wheels. The standard tyre fitment was 145/80 R14 T76 Bridgestone Ecopias or Continental Winter Tyres using very flat wheel covers to minimize turbulence. The engine block was also made from a light alloy, so even though it was a diesel, it weighed just .

The rear spoiler was reshaped, moved and extended through wind tunnel testing, and additional underbody panels were added to minimize drag to achieve a 0.25 cd figure.
The car had an automated manual transmission with a Tiptronic mode on the selector.
The car also had an ECO mode. ECO mode also activated the start/stop function, a feature that was new to European cars at the time.
In ECO mode, the clutch was disengaged when the accelerator pedal was released for maximum economy, so the car freewheels as much as possible, with the clutch re-engaging as soon as the accelerator pedal or brake pedal is touched.
The 3L also has only 4 wheel bolts and finned alloy brake drums at the rear, along with many aluminum suspension components. An internal presentation from Audi appears to indicate that the complete shell of a 3L A2 weighs around  less than that of a "normal" A2. The 3L has been noted on the Autobahn under non-scientific conditions to be faster at top speed than the standard A2, mainly as a result of the extremely long 5th gear ratio and the excellent aerodynamics.

A total of 6450 1.2 TDI models were built.

Technical specifications
The following internal combustion engines were available:

A2 Concept (2011)

At the Frankfurt Motor Show in September 2011, Audi exhibited an entirely electric concept car, the A2 concept, previewing an expected new A2 production model. The superstructure made largely from aluminium, additional parts in Carbon Fibre-Reinforced Polymer, and other construction techniques restrain the weight to only 1,150 kg.

A lithium-ion battery placed between the floor holds 24 kWh of usable charge. An electric motor is transversely mounted at the front of the vehicle, the electric motor delivers through the front wheels and uses a single-speed transmission. The vehicle will also incorporate shift-by-wire, brake-by-wire and steer-by-wire contactless technology, and LED matrix technology for the headlights and tail lights.

In June 2012, the UK's Car Magazine reported that Audi had put the electric A2 project on hold indefinitely, following disappointing European sales of other EVs, like the Nissan Leaf & Mitsubishi i-MiEV, and a projected retail price of over €40,000.

It was reported that, according to the director of e-mobility and sustainability strategy at Audi of America, the A2 electric concept was not a developmental prototype with a test program, but a one-off concept car to be shown at auto shows.

Technical specifications (2011 A2 concept)

See also
List of fuel cell vehicles

References

External links

Audi corporate website

A2
Euro NCAP superminis
Front-wheel-drive vehicles
Cars introduced in 1999
2000s cars